Munich Airport Besucherpark station is a Munich S-Bahn railway station at Munich Airport, Bavaria, Germany.

References

External links

Besucherpark
Buildings and structures in Freising (district)
Airport railway stations in Germany
Railway stations in Germany opened in 1992